Bernhard Ludvig Essendrop (21 December 1812 – 13 March 1891) was a Norwegian politician and priest in the Church of Norway.

Early life
He was born in Christiania (now Oslo) and was the brother of Bishop Carl Peter Parelius Essendrop. He served as a priest  in Søndre Throndhjems Amt (now Sør-Trøndelag). He was  parish priest of the Strinda and Bakklandet  neighborhoods in Trondheim (1851 to 1876) and village mayor during two periods (1862-1865) and (1868-1873).

Political career
He was elected to the Norwegian Parliament in 1862, 1865, 1871 and 1874, representing his county. He served as President of the Lagting during the third term, and President of the Storting from 1874. He was originally among the prominent liberals, a group which also included Johan Sverdrup, Johannes Steen and Ole Richter, but later became more moderate/conservative. After he became dean of Nidaros Cathedral in the Diocese of Nidaros at Trondheim, he was elected from the constituency of Trondhjem og Levanger in 1877 and 1880.

Later life
Essendrop also served as praeses of the Royal Norwegian Society of Sciences and Letters from 1874 to 1883. He died in March 1891.

References

1812 births
1891 deaths
Norwegian priest-politicians
Presidents of the Storting
Members of the Storting
Politicians from Trondheim
Royal Norwegian Society of Sciences and Letters